The Kintyre uranium project is located 60 km south of the Telfer gold mine and 260 km northeast of Newman at the western edge of the Great Sandy Desert in the East Pilbara region of Western Australia.

History
Uranium was discovered in the Kintyre area in 1985 by CRA Exploration Pty Ltd, now Rio Tinto. Due to depressed uranium prices CRA placed the project on care and maintenance in 1998. The camp was dismantled and the site rehabilitated in 2002. The deposit was initially within the Karlamilyi National Park, but the area enclosing the deposit was excised from the park in 1994.

The Kintyre property was acquired in 2008 by a 70:30 joint venture between Cameco Corporation and Mitsubishi Corporation. The project is operated by Cameco Australia Pty Ltd, a wholly owned subsidiary of Cameco. The project has an indicated mineral resource of 3.9 million tonnes grading 0.62% U3O8, for a total of 53.5 million pounds of U3O8.

See also
Uranium mining in Australia
Uranium ore deposits

References

External links

Mining in Western Australia
Mineral exploration
Uranium mining in Western Australia